The Hunt for Red October is a 1990 American submarine spy thriller film directed by John McTiernan, produced by Mace Neufeld, and starring Sean Connery, Alec Baldwin, Scott Glenn, James Earl Jones, and Sam Neill. The film is an adaptation of Tom Clancy's 1984 bestselling novel of the same name. It is the first installment of the film series with the protagonist Jack Ryan.

The story is set during the late Cold War era and involves a rogue Soviet naval captain who wishes to defect to the United States with his officers and the Soviet Navy's newest and most advanced ballistic missile submarine, a fictional improvement on the Soviet Typhoon-class submarine. A CIA analyst correctly deduces his motive and must prove his theory to the U.S. Navy before a violent confrontation between the Soviet and the American navies spirals out of control.

The film was a co-production between the motion picture studios Paramount Pictures, Mace Neufeld Productions, and Nina Saxon Film Design. Theatrically, it was commercially distributed by Paramount Pictures and by the Paramount Home Entertainment division for home media markets. Following its wide theatrical release, the film was nominated for and won a number of accolades. At the 63rd Academy Awards, the film was honored with the Academy Award for Best Sound Editing, along with nominations for Best Sound Mixing and Best Film Editing. On June 12, 1990, the original soundtrack, composed and conducted by Basil Poledouris, was released by MCA Records. The Hunt for Red October received mostly positive reviews from critics and was the sixth-highest-grossing domestic film of the year, generating $122 million in North America and more than $200 million worldwide in box office business.

Plot
Ramius leaves port to conduct exercises along with Alfa-class attack submarine V. K. Konovalov, commanded by his former student Captain Tupolev. At sea, Ramius secretly kills political officer Ivan Putin and relays false orders to his crew that they are to conduct missile drills off America's east coast. American  attack submarine USS Dallas, which had been shadowing Red October, loses contact once the sub's caterpillar drive is engaged.

CIA analyst and former Marine Jack Ryan, after consulting with Vice Admiral James Greer, the Deputy Director of the CIA, briefs government officials on Red October and the threat it poses. After learning that the bulk of the Soviet Navy has been deployed to the Atlantic to find and sink the sub, they conclude that Ramius plans a renegade nuclear strike. During the briefing, Ryan hypothesizes that Ramius, a native-born Lithuanian widower with few remaining personal ties to the Soviet Union, instead plans to defect to the United States, and National Security Advisor Jeffrey Pelt gives Ryan three days to confirm his theory. He is sent to an aircraft carrier in the mid-Atlantic. Meanwhile, after some delay, Tupolev also receives orders to intercept and destroy Red October.

Due to an unknown saboteur's actions, Red Octobers caterpillar drive malfunctions during risky maneuvers through a narrow undersea canyon. Petty Officer Jones, a sonar technician aboard Dallas, discovers a way to detect Red October using his underwater acoustics software, and Dallas plots an intercept course. After a hazardous mid-ocean transfer, Ryan is able to board Dallas, where he attempts to persuade its captain, Commander Bart Mancuso, to contact Ramius and determine his real intentions.

The Soviet ambassador informs the U.S. government that Ramius is a renegade and asks for help in sinking Red October. That order is sent to the U.S. fleet, including Dallas, which has reacquired the Soviet sub. Ryan remains convinced that Ramius plans to defect with his officers and finally convinces Mancuso to contact Ramius and offer assistance. Ramius, stunned that the Americans correctly guessed his plan, accepts Mancuso's offer. He then stages a nuclear reactor "emergency", ordering the sub to surface and his crew to abandon ship. After a U.S. frigate is spotted heading right for them, Ramius submerges, leaving his crew in life rafts. Ryan, Mancuso, and Jones board Red October via a rescue sub. Docking with Red October, they meet Ramius who requests asylum for himself and his officers.

Red October is suddenly ambushed by Konovalov. As the two Soviet subs maneuver, one of Red Octobers cooks, Loginov, is revealed to be an undercover GRU agent and the saboteur. He opens fire on the bridge, fatally wounding first officer Vasily Borodin, before retreating to the missile bay, intending to ignite a missile engine and destroy the ship. Loginov is pursued by Ryan and Ramius, and he wounds Ramius before being killed by Ryan. Meanwhile, Konovalov fires upon Red October with a torpedo, which Dallas is able to divert toward herself and evade by launching countermeasures and conducting an emergency blow to the surface. The torpedo reacquires Red October but Mancuso, placed in temporary command by Ramius, executes a maneuver that diverts the torpedo towards Konovalov, which it strikes and destroys. The crew of Red October, now rescued, witness the explosion from the deck of the U.S. frigate. Unaware of the second Soviet submarine, they believe that Ramius has sacrificed himself and scuttled Red October to avoid being boarded.

Ryan and Ramius, their subterfuge complete, navigate Red October to the Penobscot River in Maine. Ramius admits that he defected because he believed Red October was intended for a preemptive nuclear first strike against the United States and was unwilling to support such an action. Ryan boards a flight home to London and, thanks to his exertions, is finally able to sleep aboard a plane while seated next to a teddy bear intended for his daughter.

Cast

 Sean Connery as Captain 1st rank Marko Ramius, Commanding Officer of Red October
 Alec Baldwin as Jack Ryan, CIA intelligence analyst, author, Professor of Naval History at the United States Naval Academy
 Joss Ackland as Andrei Lysenko, Soviet Ambassador to the United States
 Tim Curry as Dr. Petrov, Medical Officer on Red October
 Peter Firth as Ivan Putin, Political Officer of Red October
 Scott Glenn as Commander Bart Mancuso, USN, Commanding Officer of 
 James Earl Jones as Vice Admiral James Greer, USN, Deputy Director of the CIA
 Jeffrey Jones as Skip Tyler, a former submarine commander who identifies Red Octobers propulsion system
 Richard Jordan as Jeffrey Pelt, National Security Advisor
 Sam Neill as Captain 2nd rank Vasily Borodin, Executive Officer of Red October
 Stellan Skarsgård as Captain 2nd rank Viktor Tupolev, Commanding Officer of Konovalov and Ramius's former student
 Fred Thompson as Rear Admiral Joshua Painter, USN, Commander of the Enterprise carrier battle group
 Courtney B. Vance as Petty Officer Jones, sonar operator of USS Dallas
 Tomas Arana as Loginov, a GRU agent on Red October
 Timothy Carhart as Lt. Commander Bill Steiner, USN, officer in charge of the US Navy's deep-submergence rescue vehicle Mystic
 Daniel Davis as Captain Charlie Davenport, Commanding Officer of 
 Anatoly Davydov as Officer #1, Red October
 Michael Welden as Navigator Gregoriy Kamarov of Red October
 Rick Ducommun as C-2A Navigator
 Larry Ferguson as  Master Chief Petty Officer Watson, USN, Chief of the boat, USS Dallas
 Ronald Guttman as Lt. Melekhin, Chief Engineer of Red October
 Christopher Janczar as Yevgeni Bonovia, Executive Officer of Konovalov
 Anthony Peck as Lt. Commander Thompson, Executive Officer of USS Dallas
 Ned Vaughn as Seaman Beaumont, a junior sonar operator on USS Dallas
 Gates McFadden as Caroline/Cathy Ryan, Jack's wife

In addition, the director's father, John McTiernan Sr., has a credited cameo as one of the attendees at Ryan's briefing of the National Security Advisor.

Production

Development
Producer Mace Neufeld optioned Tom Clancy's novel after reading galley proofs in February 1985. Despite the book becoming a best seller, no Hollywood studio was interested because of its content. Neufeld said, "I read some of the reports from the other studios, and the story was too complicated to understand". After a year and a half he finally got a high-level executive at Paramount Pictures to read Clancy's novel and agree to develop it into a film.

Screenwriters Larry Ferguson and Donald Stewart worked on the screenplay while Neufeld approached the U.S. Navy for approval. They feared top secret information or technology might be revealed. However, several admirals liked Clancy's book and reasoned that the film could do for submariners what Top Gun did for the Navy's jet fighter pilots. Captain Michael Sherman, director of the Navy's western regional information office in Los Angeles, suggested changes to the script that would present the Navy in a positive light.

Key cast and crew members rode along in subs, including Alec Baldwin and Scott Glenn, who took an overnight trip aboard  commanded by then Commander Thomas B. Fargo. Glenn based his portrayal of Commander Bart Mancuso on Fargo.

The film is a somewhat faithful adaptation of Clancy's novel, though there are many deviations, including Red October traveling up the Penobscot River in Maine to dry dock, the omission of the Royal Navy task force including Ryan's time aboard , the death of Borodin rather than Kamarov, and V. K. Konovalov being serendipitously destroyed by its own torpedo as opposed to being rammed by Red October, with the planned explosion of USS Ethan Allen as a subterfuge.

Casting
Some of the principal cast had previous military service which they drew on for their roles. Sean Connery had served in the Royal Navy, Scott Glenn in the United States Marine Corps, and James Earl Jones in the United States Army. Baldwin and Glenn spent time on a Los Angeles-class submarine. Baldwin was trained to drive an attack submarine. Some extras portraying the Dallas crew were serving submariners, including the pilot of the DSRV, Lt Cmdr George Billy. Submariners from San Diego were cast as extras because it was easier to hire them than to train actors. According to an article in Sea Classics, at least two sailors from the Atlantic Fleet-based Dallas took leave and participated in the Pacific Fleet-supported filming. The crew of Houston called their month-long filming schedule the "Hunt for Red Ops." Houston made more than 40 emergency surfacing "blows" for rehearsal and for the cameras.

The filmmakers' first choice to portray Jack Ryan was Kevin Costner, who turned down the film in order to star in and direct Dances with Wolves. Harrison Ford was also approached to play Jack Ryan but turned it down; he would later replace Alec Baldwin as Ryan in Patriot Games. Baldwin was approached in December 1988, but was not told for what role. Klaus Maria Brandauer was cast as Soviet sub commander Marko Ramius but quit two weeks into filming due to a prior commitment. The producers faxed the script to Sean Connery, who at first declined because the script seemed implausible in portraying the Soviet Union as an ambitious naval power. He was missing the first page which set the story before Gorbachev's coming to power, when the events of the book would have seemed more plausible. He arrived in L.A. on a Friday and was supposed to start filming on Monday but he requested a day to rehearse. Principal photography began on April 3, 1989 with a $30 million budget. The Navy lent the film crew Houston, two frigates ( and ), helicopters, and a dry-dock crew.

Filmmaker John Milius revised some of the film's script, writing a few speeches for Sean Connery and all of his Russian dialogue. He was asked to rewrite the whole film but was only required to do the Russian sequences. Rather than choosing between the realism of Russian dialog with subtitles, or the audience-friendly use of English (with or without Russian accents), the filmmakers compromised with a deliberate conceit. The film begins with the actors speaking Russian with English subtitles. But in an early scene, actor Peter Firth casually switches in mid-sentence to speaking in English on the word "Armageddon", which is the same spoken word in both languages. After that point, all the Soviets' dialogue is communicated in English. Connery continued using his native Scottish accent for the rest of the motion picture. Only towards the climax of the film, at the beginning of the scene in which the Soviet and American submariners meet, do some of the actors speak in Russian again.

Filming
Filming in submarines was impractical. Instead, five soundstages on the Paramount backlot were used. Two  platforms housing mock-ups of Red October and Dallas were built, standing on hydraulic gimbals that simulated the sub's movements. Connery recalled, "It was very claustrophobic. It got very hot on the sets, and I'm also prone to sea sickness. The set would tilt to 45 degrees. Very disturbing." The veteran actor shot for four weeks and the rest of the production shot for additional months on location in Port Angeles, Washington and the waters off Los Angeles. Scenes of a shipyard in Patuxent, Maryland were filmed at a submarine base in Point Loma, San Diego.

Made before the extensive use of CGI became the norm in filmmaking, the film's opening sequence featured a long pull-out reveal of the immense titular Typhoon-class sub. It included a nearly full-scale, above-the-water-line mockup of the sub, constructed from two barges welded together. Each country's submarine had its own background color: Soviet submarines, such as Red October and V.K. Konovalov, had interiors in black with chrome trim. American ships, such as Dallas and Enterprise, had grey interiors. Early filming was aboard USS Reuben James in the area of the Juan de Fuca Strait and Puget Sound in March 1989. The ship operated out of U.S. Coast Guard Station Port Angeles. The SH-60B detachment from the Battlecats of HSL-43 operated out of NAS Whidbey Island, after being displaced by the film crew. Most underwater scenes were filmed using smoke with a model sub connected to 12 cables, giving precise, smooth control for turns. Computer effects, in their infancy, created bubbles and other effects such as particulates in the water.

By March 1990, just before the film's theatrical release, the Soviet Parliament removed the Communist Party from government, effectively ending the Cold War. Set during this period, there were concerns that with its end, the film would be irrelevant but Neufeld felt that it "never really represented a major problem". To compensate for the change in the Soviet Union's political climate, an on-screen crawl appears at the beginning of the film stating that it takes place in 1984 during the Cold War. Tony Seiniger designed the film's poster and drew inspiration from Soviet poster art, using bold red, white and black graphics. According to him, the whole ad campaign was designed to have a "techno-suspense quality to it". The idea was to play up the thriller aspects and downplay the political elements.

The film caused a minor sensation in the black projects submarine warfare technology community. In one scene, where USS Dallas is chasing Red October through the submarine canyon, the crew can be heard calling out that they have various "milligal anomalies". This essentially revealed the use of gravimetry as a method of silent navigation in US submarines (though this method of navigation had been explained as the navigation method of the Red October in the book six years earlier). Thought to be a billion dollar black project, the development of a full-tensor gravity gradiometer by Bell Aerospace was a classified technology at the time. It was thought to be deployed on only a few s after it was first developed in 1973. Bell Aerospace later sold the technology to Bell Geospace for oil exploration purposes. The last Typhoon-class submarine was officially laid down in 1986, under the name TK-210, but according to sources was never finished and scrapped in 1990.

Music

The musical score of The Hunt for Red October was composed and conducted by Basil Poledouris. A soundtrack album composed of ten melodies was released on June 12, 1990. The album is missing some of the musical moments present in the film, including the scene where the crew of Red October sings the Soviet national hymn. The soundtrack is limited due to the fact that it was originally compiled to fit the Compact Cassette. Later, it was remastered for the CD. An expanded version was released in late 2013 by Intrada Records. It features 40 additional minutes of the score, including the until-then-unreleased end titles.

Release

Home media
For the 30th anniversary commemoration, Paramount Home Entertainment released a 4K Steelbook + Blu-ray+Digital version of the film.

Reception

Box office
The Hunt for Red October opened in 1,225 theaters on March 2, 1990, grossing $17 million on its opening weekend, more than half its budget. The film opened at number one at the U.S. box office and remained there for three weeks. Its opening was the 20th biggest weekend of all time and the biggest non-summer, non-Thanksgiving weekend to date.

The film went on to gross $122,012,643 in North America with a worldwide total of $200,512,643.

Critical response
On Rotten Tomatoes the film holds an approval rating of 88% based on 73 reviews, with an average rating of 7.70/10. The site's consensus states: "Perfectly cast and packed with suspense, The Hunt for Red October is an old-fashioned submarine thriller with plenty of firepower to spare." On Metacritic, it has a weighted average score of 58 out of 100 based on 17 critics, indicating "mixed or average views". Audiences polled by CinemaScore gave the film an average grade of "A" on an A+ to F scale.

Roger Ebert gave the film three-and-a-half stars out of four, calling it "a skillful, efficient film that involves us in the clever and deceptive game being played", while Gene Siskel commented on the film's technical achievement and Baldwin's convincing portrayal of Jack Ryan. Nick Schager, for Slant magazine's review, noted, "The Hunt for Red October is a thrilling edge-of-your-seat trifle that has admirably withstood the test of time". In contrast, Newsweeks David Ansen wrote, "But it's at the gut level that Red October disappoints. This smoother, impressively mounted machine is curiously ungripping. Like an overfilled kettle, it takes far too long to come to a boil". Vincent Canby, writing for The New York Times, opined that "the characters, like the lethal hardware, are simply functions of the plot, which in this case seems to be a lot more complex than it really is".

Accolades
The Hunt for Red October was nominated and won several awards in 1991. In addition, the film was also nominated for AFI's 100 Years...100 Thrills.

See also

 1990 in film
 The Hunt for Red October (1990 video game)
 The Hunt for Red October (console game)

References

External links

American political thriller films
American spy films
Cold War submarine films
Films based on American novels
Films based on military novels
Films based on works by Tom Clancy
Films directed by John McTiernan
Films produced by Mace Neufeld
Films scored by Basil Poledouris
Films set in Maine
Films set in Polyarny, Murmansk Oblast
Films set in the Atlantic Ocean
Films set in the Soviet Union
Films set in Virginia
Films shot in Alaska
Films shot in California
Films shot in Connecticut
Films shot in England
Films shot in North Carolina
Films shot in Washington (state)
Films that won the Best Sound Editing Academy Award
Films with screenplays by Larry Ferguson
Military of Russia in films
Murder in films
Paramount Pictures films
1990s Russian-language films
Ryanverse films
Films set on aircraft carriers
1990 films
1990s spy thriller films
Films set in 1984
1990s English-language films
1990s American films
Films shot in San Diego